U.S. Catanzaro 1929 is an Italian professional football club based in Catanzaro, Calabria, who play their matches in Stadio Nicola Ceravolo. The club was officially formed in 1929 after entering teams in interregional tournaments from 1927.

The club has won six interregional level three titles, one interregional level four title, one national level four scudetto, and the Cup of the Alps in 1960 as part of the Italian Federation. Its best result in the Coppa Italia was runners-up in 1965–66. The club has competed in the Serie A seven times.

This list details the club's achievements in major competitions, and the top scorers for each season. Top scorers in bold were also the top scorers in the Italian league that season.

Key

Key to league record and result:
 Pld = Games played
 W = Games won
 D = Games drawn
 L = Games lost
 GF = Goals for
 GA = Goals against
 Pts = Points
 Pos = Final position
 Res = Result
 GS = Promotion play-off, group stage 
 TB = Promotion tie-breaker
 RQF = Regional quarter-final
 RSF = Regional wemi-final
 RF = Regional final
 1R, 2R = First or second round
 1NR, 2NR = First or second national round
 QF = Quarter-final
 SF = Semi-final
 F = Final
 RPO = Regional play-out

Key to league competitions:
 Serie A = Italian 1st tier (1926–present)
 Serie B = Italian 2nd tier (1929–present)
 Serie C / Lega Pro = Italian 3rd tier (1935–1978, 2014–present)
 Serie C1 / Lega Pro Prima Divisione = Italian 3rd tier (1978–2014)
 Serie C2 / Lega Pro Seconda Divisione = Italian 4th tier (1978–2014)
 IV Serie = Italian 4th tier (1952–1978, 2014–present)
 Prima Divisione = 3rd Tier (1929–1935), 4th Tier (1935–1948)
 Terza Divisione = 4th Tier (1926–1929), 5th Tier (1929–1935)

Key to cup record:
 QR = Qualifying round
 PR1 = Preliminary round 1
 PR2 = Preliminary round 2
 1R = First round
 1GS = First round (group stage)
 GS = First round (group stage)
 2R = Second round
 2GS = Second round (group stage)
 3R = Third round
 R32 = round of 32
 IMR = Intermediate round
 R16 = round of 16
 QF = Quarter-finals
 SF = Semi-finals

Key to cup tournaments:
 SSD = Scudetto Serie D (1952–present)
 CA = Cup of the Alps (1960–1987)
 AIC = Anglo-Italian Cup (1970–1996)
 TdC = Torneo di Capodanno (1981)
 CIC = Coppa Italia Serie C (1972–present)
 SCdSC = Supercoppa di Serie C (2000–present)
 EC = European Cup (1955–1992)
 UCL = UEFA Champions League (1993–present)
 CWC = UEFA Cup Winners' Cup (1960–1999)
 UC = UEFA Cup (1971–2008)
 UEL = UEFA Europa League (2009–present)
 USC = UEFA Super Cup
 INT = Intercontinental Cup (1960–2004)
 WC = FIFA Club World Cup (2005–present)

Key to position colours and symbols:

Key to divisional tiers colours:

Seasons

Notes 
Source:

Footnotes

References 

 
Seasons
Catanzaro